Bruce Richard Robertson, CM (born April 27, 1953) is a male former freestyle and butterfly swimmer from Canada,.

Swimming career
Robertson competed for his native country at two consecutive Summer Olympics, starting in 1972 in Munich.  There he won the silver medal in the 100-metre butterfly, and bronze in the 4×100-metre medley relay, alongside Erik Fish, William Mahony and Robert Kasting.

A specialist in the butterfly stroke, his greatest achievement was winning the 100-metre butterfly race at the 1973 World Aquatics Championships in Belgrade – the first world championship swimming performance by a Canadian in over 60 years.  Robertson also swam on the third place 4×100-metre medley relay team there.  At the 1974 British Commonwealth Games in Christchurch, he won two gold, two silver and two bronze medals. In 1973, he was named male Athlete of the Year, and was honoured with the Order of Canada. He was awarded the Queen Elizabeth II Golden Jubilee Medal in 2002.

Despite being of Canadian nationality he won the ASA National British Championships title over 100 metres butterfly in 1971.

He currently lives in Manotick, Ontario, Canada. and swims with the Nepean Masters Swim Club in Barrhaven, Ontario and holds Canadian national age-group records in the 100m freestyle and 200m freestyle.

See also
 List of Commonwealth Games medallists in swimming (men)
 List of Olympic medalists in swimming (men)

References

External links
 Bruce Robertson at Swimming Canada
 
 
 
 
 

1953 births
Living people
Olympic swimmers of Canada
Canadian male butterfly swimmers
Canadian male freestyle swimmers
Medalists at the 1972 Summer Olympics
Olympic bronze medalists for Canada
Olympic silver medalists for Canada
Olympic bronze medalists in swimming
Swimmers from Vancouver
Swimmers at the 1972 Summer Olympics
Swimmers at the 1975 Pan American Games
Swimmers at the 1976 Summer Olympics
World Aquatics Championships medalists in swimming
Pan American Games silver medalists for Canada
Pan American Games bronze medalists for Canada
Olympic silver medalists in swimming
Commonwealth Games medallists in swimming
Commonwealth Games gold medallists for Canada
Commonwealth Games silver medallists for Canada
Commonwealth Games bronze medallists for Canada
Pan American Games medalists in swimming
Swimmers at the 1974 British Commonwealth Games
Medalists at the 1975 Pan American Games
Medallists at the 1974 British Commonwealth Games